Morris Saffian (July 11, 1924 – October 17, 1981), better known by the pseudonyms Ray Saffian (R.S.) Allen, Ray Allen Saffian, and Ray Allen, was an American writer of radio, and television programs and motion picture screenplays, and a television producer. He was born and raised in Seattle, Washington.

Biography
Usually collaborating with longtime writing partner Harvey Bullock, Allen co-wrote for a large number of television programs, including The Andy Griffith Show, The Flintstones, Gomer Pyle, U.S.M.C., Hogan's Heroes, and The Love Boat. Allen and Bullock also created the TV series Rango, and wrote the screenplays for the feature films Girl Happy (starring Elvis Presley), The Man Called Flintstone (1966), and Don't Drink the Water (1969), among others. As writer-producers, Allen and Bullock collaborated on shows such as Wait Till Your Father Gets Home, The Love Boat, and Alice.

Allen was a native of New York City. He died in Los Angeles, California at the age of 57.

Awards and nominations 
Allen and Bullock received a Random House award in 1956 and were nominated for an Emmy Award in 1976 for a children's program called Papa and Me.

Television credits 
The Andy Griffith Show
Hogan's Heroes
The Flintstones
Top Cat
The Dick Van Dyke Show
I Spy
Gomer Pyle, U.S.M.C.
Wait Till Your Father Gets Home
Alice
The Love Boat
The Jetsons
Return to Mayberry

Film credits 
Honeymoon Hotel
Girl Happy
The Man Called Flintstone
Who's Minding the Mint?
With Six You Get Eggroll
Don't Drink the Water

References

External links

1924 births
1981 deaths
Writers from New York City
American male screenwriters
American television writers
Television producers from New York City
American male television writers
20th-century American businesspeople
Screenwriters from New York (state)
20th-century American male writers
20th-century American screenwriters